Terence Rawlings (4 November 1933 – 23 April 2019) was a British film editor and sound editor with several BAFTA nominations and one Academy Award nomination. His credits as a sound editor date from 1962–1977, after which he was credited primarily as a film editor.

Career
A founding member of the Guild of British Film and Television Editors, Rawlings was also elected to membership in the American Cinema Editors, and received the organization's 2006 Career Achievement Award. He was nominated for an Oscar for his work on Chariots of Fire and for BAFTAs for both Alien and Blade Runner.

Personal life and death
He lived in north London with his wife. He died at his home in Hertfordshire on 23 April 2019, at the age of 85.

Filmography
The Sentinel (1977)
Watership Down (1978)
Alien (1979)
The Awakening (1980)
Chariots of Fire (1981)
Blade Runner (1982) (credited as "supervising editor". Despite being the film's editor, British citizen Rawlings was not allowed a full editor credit because he did not belong to an American film labor union)
Yentl (1983)
Legend (1985)
F/X (1986)
White of the Eye (1987)
The Lonely Passion of Judith Hearne (1987)
Slipstream (1989)
Bullseye! (1990)
Not Without My Daughter (1991)
Alien 3 (1992)
No Escape (1994)
Trapped in Paradise (1994)
GoldenEye (1995)
The Saint (1997)
U.S. Marshals (1998)
Entrapment (1999)
The Musketeer (2001)
The Core (2003)
The Phantom of the Opera (2004)

Awards
 1970 - Nominated for BAFTA Award for Best Sound Track for Isadora and Women in Love.
 1980 - Nominated for BAFTA Award for Best Editing for Alien.
 1982 - Nominated for BAFTA and Academy Award for Best Film Editing for Chariots of Fire.
 1983 - Nominated for BAFTA Award for Best Film Editing for Blade Runner.
 2003 - Won DVDX Award for Best Audio Commentary (shared with Ridley Scott, Ronald Shusett, Sigourney Weaver, Tom Skerritt, Veronica Cartwright, Harry Dean Stanton and John Hurt)
 2006 - Received the American Cinema Editors Career Achievement Award.

References

External links
Terry Rawlings at the British Film Institute

1933 births
2019 deaths
English film editors
American Cinema Editors
Film people from London